Mulberry–Pleasant View Bi-County School District is a public school district based in Mulberry, Arkansas. The school district encompasses  of land, including portions of Franklin County and Crawford County serving all or portions of communities including Mulberry, Ozark, Alma, and Dyer.

The district proves comprehensive education for more than 400 pre-kindergarten through grade 12 students while employing more than 100 teachers and staff. The district and its schools are accredited by the Arkansas Department of Education.

History 
On July 1, 2004 the district was established by the consolidation of the Mulberry School District and the Pleasant View School District.

Schools 
 Mulberry High School, located in Mulberry and serving more than 90 students in grades 10 through 12.
 Pleasant View Junior High School, located in Ozark and serving more than 100 students in grades 7 through 9.
 Millsap Intermediate School, located in Ozark and serving more than 50 students in grades 5 and 6.
 Marvin Primary School, located in Mulberry and serving more than 150 students in kindergarten through grade 4.

References

External links 
 

School districts in Arkansas
Education in Crawford County, Arkansas
Education in Franklin County, Arkansas
2004 establishments in Arkansas
School districts established in 2004